Nos Annees Francaises is a 2012 Chinese historical TV series directed by Kang Honglei and written by Li Kewei. It stars Zhu Yawen, Zhong Qiu, Li Liang, Zhang Nianhua, Lyu Xia, Wang Fang, Li Zimo, and Liu Zhiyang.  It was first broadcast on June 26, 2012 on CCTV-1.

Synopsis
In 1912, after the establishment of the Republic of China (1912-1949), some young students witness the invasion of China by the Imperialist countries, they decides to find a way to save the country. Li Shizeng, Wu Yuzhang, Wu Zhihui, Zhang Ji organize the Organization of the "Work-Study Program in France". Zhou Enlai, Deng Xiaoping, Zhao Shiyan, Cai Hesen, Xiang Jingyu, Wang Ruofei, Chen Yannian, Chen Qiaonian, Chen Yi, Nie Rongzhen, Li Fuchun, Li Weihan, Li Lisan, Cai Chang, Fu Zhong, He Changgong, Xiao San, and others win the opportunity to study abroad. They see the achievements of European Industrial Revolution and the Second Industrial Revolution in France. They realize that only science and democracy could save China, and point out the direction for their later revolutionary cause.

Cast

Main
 Zhu Yawen as Zhou Enlai
 Zhong Qiu as Deng Xiaoping
 Li Liang as Zhao Shiyan
 Zhang Nianhua as Cai Hesen
 Lyu Xia as Xiang Jingyu
 Dai Xu as Chen Qiaonian
 Zhang Feng as Chen Yannian
 Wang Fang as Nie Rongzhen
 Li Zimo as Li Lisan
 Liu Zhiyang as Li Fuchun
 Yi Junzheng as Chen Yi
 Wu Xiaodan as Cai Chang
 Yin Hang as Zhang Ruoming
 Huang Chao as Wang Ruofei
 Yuan Wenkang as Zeng Xuzhi

Supporting
 Li Yike as Li Huolian
 Ma Xiaocan as Chen Gongpei
 Deng Sha as Luo Yapin
 Wu Di as He Changgong
 Tang Yinuo as Deng Shaosheng
 Zhang Guoqiang as Zhang Shenfu
 Tian Xiaojie as Cai Yuanpei
 Fang Yi'an as Deng Yingchao
 Pierre Mirochnikoff as The French Ministry of Foreign Affairs

Music

Awards

References

External links
 
 Nos Annees Francaises Sina.com
 Nos Annees Francaises Communist Youth League of China

2012 Chinese television series debuts
2012 Chinese television series endings
Chinese historical television series